Daphnella tosaensis is a species of sea snail, a marine gastropod mollusk in the family Raphitomidae.

Description
The length of the shell attains 27 mm.

Distribution
This marine species occurs off Japan and the Philippines

References

 Hasegawa, K., Okutani, T. and E. Tsuchida (2000)Family Turridae.In: Okutani, T. (ed.), Marine Mollusks in Japan. Tokai University Press, Tokyo, 619-667 (in Japanese).

External links
 

tosaensis
Gastropods described in 1962